Arc suppression is the reduction of sparks formed when current-carrying contacts are separated. The spark is a luminous discharge of highly energized electrons and ions, and is an electric arc.

Uses

There are several possible areas of use of arc suppression methods, among them metal film deposition and sputtering, arc flash protection, electrostatic processes where electrical arcs are not desired (such as powder painting, air purification, polyvinylidene fluoride (PVDF) film poling) and contact current arc suppression. In industrial, military and consumer electronic design, the latter method generally applies to devices such as electromechanical power switches, relays and contactors. In this context, arc suppression is contact protection.

Contact protection 

Every time an electrical power device (for example: heaters, lamps, motors, transformers or similar power loads) turns on or off, its switch, relay or contactor transitions either from a closed to an open state (break arc) or from an open to a closed state (make arc and bounce arc), under load, an electrical arc occurs between the two contact points (electrodes) of the switch.  The break arc is typically more energetic and thus more destructive.

The temperature of the resulting electric arc is very high (tens of thousands of degrees), causing the metal on the contact surfaces to melt, pool and migrate with the current. The high temperature of the arc cracks the surrounding gas molecules creating ozone, carbon monoxide, and other compounds. The arc energy slowly destroys the contact metal, causing some material to escape into the air as fine particulate matter. This very activity causes the material in the contacts to degrade quickly, resulting in device failure.

Arc suppression is an area of interest in engineering because of the destructive effects of the electrical arc to electromechanical power switches, relays and contactors’ points of contact.

Effectiveness
The efficacy of an arc suppression solution for contact protection can be assessed, by comparing the arc intensity with the help of the following methods:

Visual inspection of the arc: The electrical arc can be visually observed on an electromechanical power switch, relay and contactor, with visible contacts, while the contacts are opening and closing under load.
Graphical representation of measurements obtained by an oscilloscope:  The electrical arc can be observed by using an oscilloscope to trace the voltage wave form across the contact terminals while the contacts are opening and closing under load.

Common devices 

Common devices used to prevent arcs are capacitors, snubbers, diodes, Zener diodes, varistors, and transient voltage suppressors. Contact arc suppression solutions that are considered more effective:
Two-wire contact arc suppressor
Solid state relays are not electromechanical, have no contacts, and, thus, do not create electrical arcs. 
Hybrid power relays
Hybrid power contactors

Benefits of arc suppression

Arc suppression techniques can produce a number of benefits:    
Minimised contact damage from arcing and therefore reduced maintenance, repair and replacement frequency.
Increased contact reliability.
Reduced heat generation resulting in less heat management measures such as venting and fans.
Reduced ozone and pollutant emissions.
Reduced electromagnetic interference (EMI) from arcs - a common source of radiated EMI.

See also
Contact protection

References

Further reading
Relays - Frequently Asked Questions
Arc suppression articles on Institute of Electrical and Electronics Engineers website

Electric arcs
Electrical discharge in gases